Terrorism in Australia deals with terrorist acts in Australia as well as steps taken by the Australian government to counter the threat of terrorism. In 2004 the Australian government has identified transnational terrorism as also a threat to Australia and to Australian citizens overseas. Australia has experienced acts of modern terrorism since the 1960s, while the federal parliament, since the 1970s, has enacted legislation seeking to target terrorism.

Terrorism is defined as "an action or threat of action where the action causes certain defined forms of harm or interference and the action is done or the threat is made with the intention of advancing a political, religious and ideological or group cause".

Notable terrorist attacks in Australia 
Terrorists attacks have occurred in Australia over the country's history, including the following notable incidents.

Battle of Broken Hill (1915)

Two men shot dead four people and wounded seven more, before being killed by police and military officers. At the time of their attack, they raised the flag of the Ottoman Caliphate, later the Turkish flag to identify their cause. Neither of the men were members of any official armed force. In today's parlance, their attack would be described as an act of a lone wolf. The two men were later identified as being Muslims from the British colony of India, modern-day Pakistan (some sources incorrectly identify them as Turkish).

Soviet Embassy bombing (1971)
The Embassy of the USSR was attacked by a crude bomb on 17 January 1971 in Canberra.

Sydney Yugoslav General Trade and Tourist Agency bombing (1972)

The Sydney Yugoslav General Trade and Tourist Agency bombing occurred in Haymarket, Sydney on 16 September 1972; the attack injured sixteen people. The perpetrators of the attack were believed to be Croatian separatists.

Sydney Hilton Hotel bombing (1978)

The Sydney Hilton Hotel bombing occurred on 13 February 1978; a bomb exploded outside the Hilton Hotel in Sydney, which was hosting the first Commonwealth Heads of Government Regional Meeting. Two garbage collectors and a police officer were killed and eleven others were injured.

Family Court of Australia attacks (1980–1985)

On 23 June 1980, David Opas, a judge of the Family Court, was shot dead outside his home. In March 1984, a bomb destroyed the home of fellow judge Richard Gee, who survived. In April, a bomb exploded in the Family Court building in Parramatta. In July, the wife of judge Ray Watson was killed when a bomb exploded on their doorstep. In July 1985 a bombing at a Jehovah's Witness hall killed the minister, Graham Wykes.

Iwasaki resort bombing (1980)
At 2am on 29 November 1980, the day of the Queensland State election, a nitropril and fuel oil bomb was detonated with gelignite at the Iwasaki resort construction site north of Yeppoon. The blast created a seven metre wide crater in a block of holiday units under construction. Premier Joh Bjelke-Petersen and MP Ben Humphreys labelled the incident a terrorist attack, and a caller to Rockhampton's The Morning Bulletin newspaper claimed responsibility on behalf of the "Queensland Republican Army". The media saw the motivation behind the attack as increasing resentment over Japanese land ownership in Queensland, while Petersen claimed that it was a racist attack. Two men, Eric John Geissman and Kerry Geissman, were committed to trial on 15 May 1981. Both were found not guilty after questions were raised regarding police misconduct in the investigation, a common problem in Queensland at the time.

Sydney Turkish Consul General assassination (1980) 
On 17 December 1980, Sydney Turkish Consul General Şarık Arıyak and his security attaché Engin Sever were assassinated by two people on motorcycles wielding firearms in Sydney. The Justice Commandos of the Armenian Genocide claimed responsibility but the culprits were never identified and no charges were laid. The Consul General was gunned down despite having taken precautions in the form of not travelling in the official consulate Mercedes Benz vehicle and instead being chauffeured in the trailing security attaché's car. In December 2019, it was announced that New South Wales Joint Counter Terrorism Team had established Strike Force Esslemont to re-investigate the murders. This was the first ever million-dollar reward offered in Australia for an act of terrorism.

In August 2020 police Marine Area Command divers searched Greenwich Point in relation to the assassination.

Jack van Tongeren and the ANM (1980s, 2004) 

Throughout the 1980s, The Western Australian neo-Nazi group "The Australian Nationalist Movement", led by Jack van Tongeren, engaged in a series of bombings of Asian restaurants and businesses, political violence, murder of a suspected informant and other acts to intimidate the Asian population. Van Tongeren was eventually imprisoned for a long period of time until his release in the early to mid-2000s. He resumed his activities until he was re-arrested in 2004 as part of Operation Atlantic, prompting a judge to order him to leave the state.

In February 2004 three Chinese restaurants in Perth were firebombed in the early hours of the morning. The police also identified a plot to harm Jim McGinty and his family, two police officers and an ethnic community leader, and raided Van Tongeren's home. After two separate man-hunts, the second after van Tongeren skipped bail, Van Tongeren was found and arrested in the Boddington area south-east of Perth. Van Tongeren was found guilty of planning to bomb Chinese restaurants in Perth and of organising a destructive hate campaign in 2007, but was given a 2-year suspended sentence on account of ill health. His right-hand man, John Van Blitterswyk, was given a 2-year, 4-month sentence.

Israeli consulate and Hakoah Club bombing (1982)
The bombing of the Israeli Consulate and Hakoah Club in Sydney occurred on 23 December 1982. The two bombings occurred on the same day within five hours of each other. The initial case led to a single arrest though charges were later dropped. In 2011, the NSW police and Australian federal police reopened the case citing new leads.

Turkish consulate bombing (1986) 
The Melbourne Turkish consulate bombing occurred on 23 November 1986; a car bomb exploded in a carpark beneath the Turkish Consulate in South Yarra, Victoria, killing the bomber who failed to correctly set up the explosive device. Levon Demirian, a Sydney resident with links to the Armenian Revolutionary Federation, was charged over the attack and served 10 years.

Attempted assassination of Eddie Funde (1989) 
In 1989, two Skinhead youths, inspired by the Australian-based neo-Nazi National Action group, fired shotguns at the home of African National Congress representative Eddie Funde in an assassination attempt. Head of National Action, James Saleam, was sentenced to three and a half years in jail for ordering the assassination. The trial judge described the assassination as "an act of naked political terrorism".

Perth French Consulate bombing (1995) 
In 1995, terrorists firebombed the French Consulate in Perth.

Abortion clinic attack (2001)

 
On 16 July 2001, Peter James Knight, described as an "obsessive anti-abortionist" who lived alone in a makeshift camp in rural New South Wales, attacked the East Melbourne Family Planning clinic, a privately run clinic providing abortions, carrying a rifle, and large quantities of kerosene and lighters. He shot and killed a security guard at the clinic before his capture and arrest. He was charged and convicted of murder, and was sentenced to life imprisonment with a non-parole period of 23 years. Australian terrorism academic Clive Williams listed the attack amongst incidents of politically motivated violence in Australia.

Endeavour Hills stabbings (2014) 

On 24 September 2014 an 18-year-old man, Numan Haider, was shot and killed by police outside Endeavour Hills police station. Victoria Police Assistant Commissioner Luke Cornelius said Haider had been asked to come to the police station to discuss behaviour "which had been causing some concern". When the man arrived outside the station, he stabbed the two officers as they went to meet him. The two stabbed officers, one from Victoria Police and one from the Australian Federal Police, were working together as part of a joint operation on counter-terrorism between the AFP and Victoria Police. Haider was found to be carrying two knives and an Islamic State flag.

Sydney hostage crisis (2014) 

On 15 December 2014, Man Haron Monis, took 17 people hostage inside a Lindt chocolate café in Sydney. He forced hostages to hold up a jihadist black flag against a window of the café. On the early hours of 16 December, police breached the café and fatally shot Monis following the escape of several hostages. Two hostages also died, while another four people, including a police officer, were injured in the incident.

The designation of the 2014 Sydney hostage crisis, also known as the Sydney Martin Place siege, has been subject to debate among terrorism experts and news commentators. Initially, during the early stages of the incident, the Australian government and NSW authorities did not label the event as a terrorist attack; however, as the siege continued, NSW police authorised the engagement of the state's counterterrorism task force, treating the incident as an act of terrorism. Commentators have debated whether the perpetrator of the attack, Man Haron Monis, was in fact a terrorist and whether his actions can be classified as an act of terrorism. One terrorism expert described Monis's actions as those of a "lone-wolf terrorist … driven by a desire for attention and to be in the spotlight." Another wrote in an opinion column that the attack "was very different from first-generation or second-generation terrorist attacksbut it was terrorism, and terrorism of a brutal and more unpredictable sort." Scott Stewart supervisor of the analysis of terrorism and security issues for Statfor said that this hostage-incident exhibits many of the elements associated with grassroots terrorism. By contrast, criminologist Mark Lauchs stated that the event "was not about religion and neither was it a terrorist attack." Media outlets have also provided conflicting designations for Monis; John Lehmann, editor of The Daily Telegraph, wrote how Monis filled the criteria of an Islamic State terrorist, while a columnist for The Guardian wrote how the designation of a terrorist is misplaced and would only serve the interests of ISIL. On 15 January 2015, Australia's Treasurer Joe Hockey declared the siege in Sydney's Martin Place as a terrorist incident for insurance purposes.

The difference between terrorism and terrorising acts was noted in one analysis as "enormously important"in Monis's case, terrorism "was clearly an element, but he was coming to the end of his rope with a variety of legal processes; there was clearly some mental instability." One argument was that the gunman's lack of ties to any movement did not preclude his being a terrorist as it is "an inclusive club".

Nick O'Brien, associate professor of counter terrorism at Charles Sturt University has said Islamic State's magazine claim that the Sydney siege gunman is a righteous jihadist should not be lightly dismissed. Dr David Martin Jones, Senior Lecturer at the School of Government, University of Tasmania has said not to underestimate the politically destabilising intent of Monis's lone-actor violence, as it is a considered tactic and a strategic goal of ISIL.

Parramatta shooting (2015)

On 2 October 2015, an Iranian-born Iraqi-Kurdish youth shot dead 58-year-old Curtis Cheng, an accountant who worked for the New South Wales Police Force, outside the Parramatta Police headquarters. The terrorist then shot at special constables guarding the building, and was shot dead by them. NSW Police Commissioner Andrew Scipione said "We believe that his actions were politically motivated and therefore linked to terrorism." Four other 'alleged Islamic State members' were arrested and charged in relation to the shooting.

Minto stabbing (September 2016) 
On September 10, Islamist Ihsas Khan attacked a man in a park in Minto, New South Wales. The victim was chased and repeatedly stabbed or slashed with a knife. Khan was charged with attempted murder and with committing a terrorist act. Crown prosecutor Peter Neil SC said there was evidence to suggest Mr Khan had been planning to attack a civilian at random on September 11 to coincide with the anniversary of the Al Qaeda attacks on the United States.

Queanbeyan stabbing (April 2017)

On 7 April 2017, a pair of 15- and 16-year-old boys entered a service station in the city of Queanbeyan, NSW and stabbed the attendant, 29-year-old Zeeshan Akbar of Pakistani descent, who died at the scene. Two other men were also attacked and injured nearby. Elsewhere a man was carjacked, struck with a hammer and stabbed. The 16-year-old's mother had told police that she believed her son had been radicalised in recent weeks and that he sympathised with Islamic State and had also posted concerning posts on Facebook. The police treated this as an act of terrorism. The two were arrested after a car chase. On 1 May 2020 at the NSW Supreme Court both boys were sentenced. The 16-year-old received a jail term of 35 and a half years. The 15-year-old received 18 years and 4 months.

Brighton siege (June 2017)

On 5 June 2017, 29-year-old Somali-born Islamist Yacqub Khayre shot dead receptionist Kai Hao in the foyer at a serviced apartment complex in the suburb of Brighton in Melbourne. He then took a female escort hostage in an apartment. He contacted both the police and the media. Police responded and Khayre died in a shoot-out with three police officers wounded. Khayre had referred to ISIS and al-Qaeda in a phone call to the media. In 2010 he had been acquitted of the earlier Holsworthy Barracks terror plot.

Mill Park stabbing (February 2018) 
Momena Shoma, a Bangladeshi Islamist, stabbed a 56-year-old man in the neck while he was asleep at his Callistemon Rise home in Mill Park. She has been charged with engaging in a terrorist act and it's alleged she was inspired by terror group Islamic State.

2018 Melbourne stabbing attack 

On 9 November 2018, an attack took place in Melbourne, when Hassan Khalif Shire Ali set fire to a Holden Rodeo utility on Bourke Street in the city's Central Business District. He then stabbed three pedestrians, killing one and wounding the other two. During the attack, the Holden "exploded" from the fire. Hassan Khalif was shot in the chest by a Victoria Police officer and died in hospital.

Hassan Khalif's younger brother, Ali Khalif Shire Ali, was arrested in November 2017 for planning to commit a mass shooting at Melbourne's New Year's Eve celebration.  In May 2020 Ali Khalif was sentenced to ten years jail, with a seven and a half year non-parole period.

2020 Brisbane stabbing attack 
On 19 December 2020, a knifeman killed two elderly people after storming their home and then tried to attack police officers on a highway in Brisbane. The attacker, who was shot dead by police, had been identified as a 22-year old-man who had a long history of mental health issues and escaped a GPS tracking bracelet the previous night. He was previously arrested in early 2019 attempting to travel on a one-way ticket to Somalia and arrested “on suspicion of an attempted foreign incursion”. Allegations against him were dropped by the AFP “due to a lack of evidence”. The AFP spoke after the incident and said that there was no terror threat posed by the man.

Wieambilla police killings (2022) 

Brothers Nathaniel and Gareth Train, along with Gareth's wife Stacey, murdered two police officers who they knew were conducting a concern for welfare check for Nathaniel. They then killed their next door neighbour then attempted to kill two other police officers before posting a gloating YouTube video in dialogue with an omnibus of troll grievances from the fringes of right wing movements such as extremely unverified anti vax conspiracy theories, disaffected off grid lifestylers and pro gun agenda Christian right. A shootout with police ensued later that night and the three of them were killed.

Notable terror plots
Australian police claim to have disrupted a significant number of terrorism plots since 2014.

Bob Hawke assassination plot
In 1975, the Palestinian Black September terrorist group and the Australian branch of the Popular Front for the Liberation of Palestine (PFLP) terrorist group plotted to assassinate future Australian Prime Minister Bob Hawke, then Australian Labor Party president, along with a number of notable journalists seen as being pro-Israel. A Black September member visited Australia under the guise of a journalist and was provided with materials from Australian PFLP members and returned to Israel; the Black September member who intended to carry out the attack was killed by Israeli forces before he could return to Australia.

Faheem Khalid Lodhi 

Faheem Khalid Lodhi is an Australian architect accused of an October 2003 plot to bomb the national electricity grid or Sydney defence sites in the cause of violent jihad. He was convicted by a New South Wales Supreme Court jury in June 2006 on terrorism-related offences, namely:

Preparation for terrorist attack, by seeking information for the purpose of constructing explosive devices
Seeking information and collecting maps of the Sydney electricity supply system and possessing 38 aerial photos of military installations in preparation for terrorist attacks
Possessing terrorist manuals detailing how to manufacture poisons, detonators, explosives and incendiary devices

In his judgement, Justice Anthony Whealy illustrated that Lodhi's behaviour breached the rules under the Anti Terrorism Act 2004 (Cth), Crimes Act 1914 (Cth), the Criminal Code and the Crimes (Internationally Protected Persons) Act 1976 (Cth) 

His intended targets were the national electricity supply system, the Victoria Barracks, HMAS Penguin naval base, and Holsworthy Barracks. Justice Anthony Whealy commented at sentencing that Lodhi had "the intent of advancing a political, religious or ideological cause, namely violent jihad" to "instill terror into members of the public so that they could never again feel free from the threat of bombing in Australia."

Accordingly, Whealy said the sentence to be imposed "must be a substantial one to reflect the important principles of deterrence and denunciation. In relation to count 2 the appropriate sentence, in my view, is one of imprisonment for a term of 20 years. The sentence is to commence on 22 April 2004 and to expire on 21 April 2024."

Neil Prakash 

Neil Prakash is a former Buddhist from Melbourne who became a jihadist and changed his name to name Abu Khaled al-Cambodi.

He was linked to a number of domestic terror threats, including an alleged Anzac Day terror plot in Melbourne and the shooting death of NSW police worker Curtis Cheng in western Sydney in 2015. Later, he fled to Syria and became a senior recruiter for the Islamic State in Iraq and Syria, appearing in propaganda videos and magazines with the intention of recruiting people to commit acts of terrorism.

Prakash was reportedly killed by a targeted US air strike in northern Iraq in May 2016. Australian Prime Minister Malcolm Turnbull commented: "Neil Prakash's death is a very, very positive development in the war against Daesh and the war against terror". The Herald Sun later reported that Australian security officials were "almost certain" that Prakash had not been killed in the airstrike and had continued to act as a recruiter for the group. In November 2016, Australian counter-terrorism officials confirmed that Prakash was still alive, and had been arrested after attempting to enter Turkey from Syria. On 16 March 2019, he was convicted in Turkey of membership in a terrorist organisation and sentenced to seven and a half years in prison.

In early December 2022 Prakash was extradited back to Australia and charged in Melbourne Magistrates' Court with terrorism-related offences. He was due to reappear in court in late February 2023.

Sydney Five 

Khaled Cheikho, Moustafa Cheikho, Mohamed Ali Elomar, Abdul Rakib Hasan and Mohammed Omar Jamal were found guilty of conspiring to commit a terrorist act or acts. They were jailed on 15 February 2010 for terms ranging from 23 to 28 years.

Benbrika Group in Melbourne 

In September 2008, of an original nine defendants, five men including the Muslim cleric, Abdul Nacer Benbrika were convicted of planning a terrorist attack. During the trial, the jury heard evidence of plans to bomb the 2005 AFL Grand Final, 2006 Australian Grand Prix and the Crown Casino, as well as a plot to assassinate then Prime Minister John Howard.

Despite Benbrika having completed his sentence on 5 November 2020, the Department of Home Affairs applied to the Victorian Supreme Court to keep him detained, and he was, under an interim order from the court.

Holsworthy Barracks terror plot 

On 4 August 2009, four men in Melbourne were charged over the Holsworthy Barracks terror plot, an alleged plan to storm the Holsworthy Barracks in Sydney with automatic weapons; and shoot army personnel or others until they were killed or captured. The men are allegedly connected with the Somali-based terrorist group al-Shabaab. Prime Minister Kevin Rudd subsequently announced a federal government review of security at all military bases.

In December 2011 Justice Betty King sentenced three of the men to 18 years in prison with minimum terms of 13 1/2. She said that they were all "unrepentant radical Muslims and would remain a threat to the public while they held extremist views".

2015 Anzac Day terror plot 
Sevdet Besim was arrested on 18 April 2015. Aged 18 and born to parents of Albanian origin, he planned to drive a car into and kill, then behead, a law enforcement officer on Anzac Day in Melbourne. He was subsequently sentenced to 15 years' imprisonment on 5 September 2016.

2017 airline bombing plot

In July 2017, Australian police thwarted a plot to bomb an airliner. In Sydney, four men were arrested by the Australian Federal Police and their properties were searched.
On 17 December 2019 Khaled Khayat was sentenced to 40 years in prison (non-parole period of 30 years). Mahmoud Khayat was sentenced to 36 years (non-parole period of 27 years).

Amer Khayat was the third brother who was to, unknowingly, carry the bomb onto the plane. Amer was arrested overseas and spent two and a half years in a Beirut prison. In September 2019 he was cleared of any involvement by a military tribunal.

Tamin Khaja 
On 31 October 2017, Tamin Khaja plead guilty to planning a terrorist attack on targets in Sydney that included the Timor Army Barracks and Sydney West Trial Courts. He was arrested in May 2016 as he was attempting to obtain firearms, explosives and an Islamic State flag.

2014 plot 
On 3 November 2017 Sulayman Khalid, also known as "Abu Bakr", was sentenced to up to 22 years and 6 months' jail in the NSW Supreme Court by Justice Geoffrey Bellew. He was the leader among five of six conspirators who were sentenced in connection to a plot between 7 November and 18 December 2014 that targeted government sites, including the Lithgow Correctional Centre and an Australian Federal Police building in Sydney. Jibryl Almaouie, Mohamed Almaouie, Farhad Said and an unnamed teenager were all sentenced to jail terms for their part. Ibrahim Ghazzawy, the sixth conspirator was earlier in 2017 sentenced to a minimum of 6 years and 4 months. Khalid appeared on the SBS program Insight in 2014, where he said that Islamic State only wanted to bring "justice, peace and humanitarian aid to the people". He later stormed off the set. Khalid was arrested on 23 December 2014 by Joint Counter Terrorism Team members as part of Operation Appleby.

Joshua Ryne Goldberg 

In 2015, Jewish American internet troll Joshua Goldberg was arrested for planning a bombing in Kansas City while posing as an Australian ISIS supporter. A 17-year-old Melbourne teenager who had been in contact with Goldberg pleaded guilty to preparing a terror attack, after bombs were found in his home. Goldberg's ISIS persona also attempted to incite mass shootings in Australia.

Victorian Trades Hall bombing plot 
In 2016, Phillip Galea, a Victorian man associated with the far-right group Reclaim Australia, was arrested for planning bombings of various "leftist" organisations in Melbourne, including Trades Hall in Carlton, the Melbourne Anarchist Club in Northcote and the Resistance Centre in the Melbourne CBD. He was arrested in August 2016, after police raids of his home in November 2015 found cattle prods, mercury, information relating to home-made bombs and a document drafted by Galea called the "Terrorist's Cookbook", intended to be a how-to-guide for far-right terrorists.

Galea was convicted of plotting terrorist attacks and creating a document likely to facilitate a terrorist act in December 2019 and given a 12-year jail sentence. The Court was told that his aim were to eliminate the leaders of the left in Melbourne, blaming them for the "Islamisation" of Australia.

Federation Square attack plot  
On 27 November 2017 an Australian man of Somali parentage was arrested for plotting a mass shooting. Twenty-year-old Ali Khalif Shire Ali from Werribee, Victoria was charged the next day in Melbourne Magistrates' Court with: preparing to commit a terrorist attack, and gathering documents to facilitate a terrorist act. Police believed that Ali planned to "shoot and kill as many people as he could" in Federation Square, Melbourne on New Year's Eve.

In May 2019 Ali pled guilty to preparing a terrorist attack. On 21 May 2020 he was sentenced to ten years jail, with a seven and a half years non-parole period. In December 2020 his sentence was increased to sixteen years, with a non-parole period of twelve years. Ali's brother was 30-year-old Hassan Khalif Shire Ali, who committed a stabbing attack in Melbourne in November 2018. Hassan killed one person, and was then shot and killed by police.

Counterterrorism efforts

Australians joining external conflicts 
The Islamic State of Iraq and the Levant (ISIL), proscribed by the government as a terrorist organisation, has targeted Australian Muslims for recruitment. Making use of social media, recruiters target those vulnerable to radicalisation, and encourage local jihad activities. Some of those targeted have been minors, including a 17-year-old who was arrested in Melbourne in May 2015 for plotting to detonate home-made bombs, and sentenced to 7 years jail. In June 2014, the government claimed that roughly 150 Australians had been recruited to fight in the conflicts in Syria and Iraq. A list released in April 2015 showed that most were young males who have come from a range of occupations, including students. It was also reported at the time that 249 suspected jihadists had been prevented from leaving Australia. The Australian Border Force Counter-Terrorism Unit, tasked with stopping jihadists from leaving the country, had cancelled more than 100 passports by the end of March 2015. Several jihadists have expressed the desire to return to Australia, but Prime Minister Tony Abbott has said that any who do would be prosecuted on their arrival.

In May 2016, in what became known as the 'Tinnie terror plot’, five men were arrested as they towed a boat in the Northern Territory. A sixth was arrested in Melbourne. The group was charged with "making preparations for incursions into foreign countries to engage in hostile activities." They had intended to go by sea to help Islamic insurgents in the Philippines overthrow their government. All six men were jailed. As of April 2020 two of them had been released. The leader, Musa Cerantonio was sentenced to seven years.

On 1 September 2016 Hamdi Alquidsi was sentenced to 8 years' jail (6 years minimum) by Justice Christine Adamson. In July he was found guilty of seven counts of "supporting engagement in armed hostilities" in Syria. Two men who he helped travel to Syria were killed there, two others have returned to Australia. The fate of another two is unknown, while the last never left. Alqudsi will be eligible for release in July 2022.

September 2014 AFP raids

Sydney and Brisbane 
In the early hours of 18 September 2014, large teams of Australian Federal Police (AFP) and other security agencies conducted search operations in both Sydney and Brisbane. Australian Prime Minister Tony Abbott has alluded to an alleged plot aimed at conducting a random act of terrorism as the reason for the police action. This action is described as the largest in Australian history to date. One man arrested, from Guildford, allegedly conspired to commit a "horrifying" terrorist act with a man believed to be the most senior Australian Islamic State leader.

Melbourne 
On 30 September 2014 there were more raids in Melbourne. The AFP executed seven search warrants in Broadmeadows, Flemington, Kealba, Meadow Heights and Seabrook. Over 100 officers from Federal and State police forces took part.
A man from Seabrook will be charged with "intentionally making funds available to a terrorist organisation knowing that organisation was a terrorist organisation", AFP Assistant Commissioner Gaughan said. The man is alleged to have provided money to a United States citizen who was fighting in Syria.

February 2015 Sydney raid 
On 10 February 2015 two men were arrested in Fairfield, New South Wales, and charged with "Acts done in preparation, for, or planning terrorists acts". On the morning of 10 February police were informed the two were planning a terrorist attack. They were quickly placed under surveillance and tracked. When they purchased a hunting knife from a store about 3:00 pm, NSW Joint Counter Terrorism Team (JCTT) forces decided to intervene and soon after 4:00 pm the men were arrested.

The men were a 24-year-old student from Iraq, and a 25-year-old nurse who moved from Kuwait in 2012. The two were unknown to police until the tip-off. The men's residence, a vehicle and places of work were searched. They were found with a machete, a hunting knife, a homemade Islamic State flag and "a video which depicted a man talking about carrying out an attack", according to NSW Police Deputy Commissioner (Specialist Operations) Catherine Burn. One of the men arrested appeared in the video.

Burn also said: "We will allege that both of these men were preparing to do this act yesterday" and "We believe that the men were potentially going to harm somebody, maybe even kill somebody …".

The JCTT investigation has been given the code name Operation Castrum.

May 2015 Melbourne 
On 8 May 2015 a 17-year-old was arrested in Greenvale, Melbourne for plotting to detonate home-made bombs. He was charged with:

Three alleged improvised explosive devices were found and rendered safe in a park by controlled detonation. The teenager appeared in court on 11 May and was remanded to reappear on May 26. 'Operation Amberd' was formed, and investigations made for 9 days, after a call to a security hotline. AFP and Victorian police of the Melbourne Joint Counter Terrorism Team (JCTT) carried out the raid. AFP Deputy Commissioner Mike Phelan said: "We can absolutely guarantee we have stopped something."

December 2016 Christmas terror plot 
On 23 December 2016 seven people were arrested in Melbourne for plotting an attack on Christmas Day. Properties were raided at Campbellfield, Dallas, Victoria, Flemington, Gladstone Park and Meadow Heights. The would-be terrorists planned to attack Federation Square, Flinders Street railway station and St. Paul's Cathedral, three landmarks clustered in the centre of Melbourne. An explosive device and other weapons were to be used. Abdullah Chaarani, Ahmed Mohamed and Hamza Abbas were found guilty 2 November 2018 in the High Court of Australia of plotting an attack in the name of the Islamic State. The trio smiled, laughed and made thumbs up as the verdict was announced. The police brought the weapons the trio had purchased to kill people who did not adhere to their radical version of Sunni Islam.

February 2017 Young
In late February 2017 a man was arrested at Young, New South Wales after an 18-month investigation. The man is a 42-year-old electrician and Australian citizen. He is alleged "… to have been researching how to develop laser missile detection equipment for IS and helping the extremists develop their own destructive missile arsenal". He appeared the same day at Young Local Court charged with two foreign incursion offences, and a count of "failing to comply with an order to assist access to data".

July 2019 Sydney 
On 2 July 2019 the JCTT carried out raids in Western Sydney, including in Canada Bay, Chester Hill, Greenacre, Green Valley, Ingleburn and Toongabbie. Three men aged, 20, 23 and 30-year were arrested.

On of them, Radwin Dakkak, now 25, was jailed for 18 months in December 2020 for "associating with a member of a terrorist organisation", that person being another of those arrested, Isaac El Matari, a member of Islamic State (IS). Dakkak was the first Australian to be prosecuted for this offence. Dakkak was released in January 2021 as he had already served most of  his time in custody, waiting for court proceedings to conclude. Weeks later he was rearrested for allegedly breaching a control order.

In October 2021 IS member Isaac El Matari now aged 22, was jailed for preparing a terrorist attack. He received a maximum term of 7 years and 4 months, with a 5-and-a-half year non-parole period. El Matari previously served 9 months in jail in Lebanon for attempting to join IS, after which he returned to Australia in June 2018. He was under surveillance into 2019 and spoke with associates about establishing an IS insurgency in Australia.

Anti-terrorism legislation 

Prior to the 1960s, there had not been any act in Australia that could accurately be deemed "terrorism" in the modern political and strategic sense of the word. Politically motivated violent incidents were rare, usually isolated, and for the most part driven by issues arising from political legislation, greed, or individuals being singled out, such as the attempted assassination of Australian Labor Party Leader Arthur Calwell in 1965 over his Vietnam War stance. Likewise the 1968 attack on the US Consulate in Melbourne was also regarded to be an isolated incident protesting the US involvement in Vietnam. The two exceptions to this state of affairs would be the assassination attempt on the Duke of Edinburgh in 1868 by an Irish Nationalist named O'Farrell, who was later executed for his crime, and an attack in Broken Hill in 1915 by Afghan supporters of the Sultan of Turkey.

Although it had known sporadic acts through its history, and examples of modern terrorism for almost a decade, Australia did not introduce terrorism specific laws into Parliament until the late 1970s. In 1977, after a three-year inquiry into Australia's intelligence services, Justice Robert Hope delivered his Royal Commission on Intelligence and Security (RCIS). The RCIS recommended amongst other things that the Australian Security Intelligence Organisation (ASIO) areas of investigation be widened to include terrorism. A further Protective Security Review by Justice Hope in 1978 following the Sydney Hilton bombing designated ASIO as the government agency responsible for producing national threat assessments in the field of terrorism and politically motivated violence.

Since then, successive governments have reviewed and altered the shape of both legislation and the agencies that enforce it to cope with the changing face, threat and scope of terrorism. It was not until after the attacks of 11 September 2001, however, that Australian policy began to change to reflect a growing threat against Australia and Australians specifically. Until then the view held from the 1960s had been that terrorist actions in Australia were considered as a problem imported from conflicts overseas and concerned with foreign targets on Australian soil.

2004 and 2005 
In 2004, the Howard Government introduced into Parliament three anti-terrorism bills, collectively called the Australian anti-terrorism legislation, 2004, and in 2005 the Australian Anti-Terrorism Act 2005 was passed.

Before 2006, the last legislation to be brought into effect was the Anti-Terrorism Act (No. 2) 2005.

The Anti-Money Laundering and Counter-Terrorism Financing Act 2006 (Cth) came into law on 12 December 2006, and extends the regulatory regime imposed by the Financial Transaction Reports Act 1988.

2014–2015 
New anti-terror laws were introduced in three stages in 2014:
 In July 2014, the National Security Legislation Amendment Bill (No. 1) 2014 was passed by Parliament on 25 September 2014.
 In September 2014 the Counter-Terrorism Legislation Amendment (Foreign Fighters) Bill was introduced by Attorney-General George Brandis, passed on 29 October 2014, and assented to on 3 November 2014. As part of this Bill the Crimes (Foreign Incursions and Recruitment) Act 1978 was repealed.
 In October 2014 the Telecommunications (Interception and Access) Amendment (Data Retention) Bill 2014 was introduced to amend the Telecommunications (Interception and Access) Act 1979, and then referred to the Parliamentary Joint Committee on Intelligence and Security. The Senate passed the bill as the Telecommunications (Interception and Access) Amendment (Data Retention) Act 2015 on 26 March 2015. Assent was received on 13 April 2015.

Control orders 
In the wake of the 2 October 2015 shooting death of a civilian police employee, the New South Wales government requested legal changes to allow control orders on people aged 14 and over. Attorney-General George Brandis agreed to the changes. The NSW Council for Civil Liberties criticised the proposal. The councils president Stephen Blanks said: "The proposed laws are undoubtedly going to be in breach of human rights standards,"

Shooting policy 
In November 2015 it was stated that New South Wales police were being retrained to "…shoot terrorists on sight rather than try to contain them and negotiate,…".

Terrorist organisations 

Since November 2016, there have been 20 organisations designated as terrorist organisations. Organisations can be so designated by a court or a government department. All but one of those organisations are Islamist. Identification of an organisation as a terrorist organisation may result from a prosecution for a terrorist offence, or from a listing determined by the Attorney-General of Australia. The Australian list does not correspond to similar lists of other countries or international organisations.

Stripping citizenship from terrorists 
In August 2018 five Australians who had travelled to fight with the Islamic State were stripped of Australian citizenship and barred from reentering Australia. This was possible because they had another citizenship, because international law does not permit the measure being used on individuals with only one citizenship. The five brought the total to six for Australians stripped of citizenship for acts "contrary to their allegiance to Australia".

Terrorist groups in Australia

A number of terror organisations and terror cells have operated in Australia, with their activities including fund-raising and providing material support for terror activities overseas, as well as plotting and executing domestic terrorism. The following table includes a selection of these groups.

Threats

Right wing extremists 
Various right wing extremist groups have posed tangible terrorism threats in Australia over several decades. The Australian Security Intelligence Organisation (ASIO) in the 1970s monitored Safari 8, the Legion of the Frontiersmen of the Commonwealth and the Australian Youth Coalition as terrorist threats, and from the 1980s through to the early 2000s sporadic terrorist activities were undertaken by National Action and the Australian Nationalist Movement.

In the wake of the 2019 Christchurch mosque terrorist attacks at Al Noor Mosque and Linwood Islamic Centre in Christchurch, New Zealand, perpetrated by Australian Brenton Harrison Tarrant from Grafton, a self-described "Ethno-nationalist, "Eco-fascist", "Kebab removalist" "racist", New South Wales Police Commissioner Michael Fuller identified the likelihood of right wing lone wolf terrorist attacks in Australia as "an emerging risk" and indicated he will consider boosting resources into the anti-terrorism squad focused on right-wing extremists. Recent examples of such right wing extremist 'lone wolves' include white supremacist Michael Holt, jailed for weapons and child pornography offences after threatening to carry out a mass shooting at a shopping centre on the NSW Central Coast, and Phillip Galea, convicted of terrorism charges relating to planned bombings of left wing organisations in Melbourne.

ISIL propaganda and recruitment
A number of incidents relating to the Islamic State of Iraq and the Levant (ISIL) terrorist group have involved Australians and garnered the attention of the Australian public. ISIL is a militant Sunni group which has been proscribed by Australian authorities as a terrorist organisation.

In 2014, two Australian Islamic extremists made a propaganda video encouraging Australians to join the ISIL, According to the Australian government, up to 150 Australians "have been or are currently overseas fighting with extremists in Iraq and Syria." One Australian jihadist, Khaled Sharrouf, posted a picture of himself, and another of his son, holding a decapitated soldier's head.

ISIL recruited Australian nationals for terror attacks in the Middle East including suicide bombings as late as March 2015. Eighteen-year-old Jake Bilardi, known as Jihadi Jake, converted to Sunni Islam. He died on 11 March 2015 when he carried out a suicide bombing in Ramadi, Iraq.

In 2015 it was reported that more than 20 Australians who have fought with ISIL have returned and are being monitored by security agencies. Then Foreign Minister Julie Bishop has said, "there is a risk they will come back as battle-hardened experienced terrorists ... and try to carry out terrorist attacks".

The Attorney-General Senator George Brandis has expressed concern that those fighting jihad, then returning from the Middle East, represent, "the most significant risk to Australia's security that we have faced in many years." The Australian Security Intelligence Organisation (ASIO) is concerned that Australians fighting jihad may return home to plan terror attacks. In October 2014, ISIL published an online video in which a teenage Australian Jihadi, Abdullah Elmir, threatened the United States and Australia, naming U.S. President Barack Obama and Australian Prime Minister Tony Abbott as targets.

On 6 September 2016 ISIL published a new online magazine in which they urged 'lone wolves' to carry out attacks:

The same statement was published in other languages naming locations in France, Germany and Indonesia.

Two days later on 8 September a man was detained at the Sydney Opera House after acting suspiciously. He was later charged with "threatening to destroy or damage property."

Sovereign citizens

In 2015 the New South Wales Police Force's Counter Terrorism and Special Tactics Command assessed that members of the anti-government sovereign citizen movement posed a potential terrorist threat. At the time there were reported to be 300 members of this movement in the state. While there had been no incidents of violence associated with sovereign citizens in Australia at that time, the NSW Police were concerned that members of the movement were becoming radicalised and could commit attacks such as those made by sovereign citizens in the United States.

Impact on Muslim community
Researchers have observed that Muslims in Australia have become a "stigmatised minority", subject to increased surveillance by state authorities as well as public discourse that constructs Muslims as a potential terrorist threat. Researchers term this the "suspect community" thesis. Researchers study how Muslims perceive themselves as a suspect community and how this influences their support for counter-terrorism efforts.

From August to September 2018, Sri Lankan Australian I.T. worker Mohamed Kamer Nizamdeen was held in solitary confinement after his friend framed him as having planned a terrorist attack using a planted notebook. Commenting on the case, academic Dr Vicki Sentas opined that in Australia "being Muslim can be construed as motive for terror". After the charges were withdrawn, Nizamdeen left Australia, and has since described the ordeal as having ruined his life.

See also 

 Crime in Australia
 List of terrorist incidents in Australia

References 

 
Australia
Human rights abuses in Australia